Ramon Cases Nolasco (born July 21, 1949) is a Filipino politician who is a member of the  House of Representatives representing the First District of Cagayan. He was a member of the Cagayan Provincial Board, representing the First District, and the former mayor of Gattaran, Cagayan. Nolasco is a member of the Liberal Party and a former member of the United Nationalist Alliance.

Ramon Cases Nolasco, "Mon" to his family and close friends, born on July 21, 1949, is the sixth child among the ten children of the late Dr. Tomas Nolasco, Sr. and Demetria Nolasco. He was first a lawyer under the Public Attorney's Office in Aparri, Cagayan before he entered politics and won as Mayor of Gattaran, Cagayan in 1992.

He was a two-time three-term Mayor of the said town. He ran as board member of the First District of Cagayan in 2013 and won.

On May 9, 2016 National Elections, he faced former Senate President Juan Ponce Enrile's son Jack Enrile in a battle for a seat in the Congress as Representative of the First District of Cagayan. Nolasco, despite being the underdog, was proclaimed the winner having more than 13,000 votes ahead of Enrile.

See also
17th Congress of the Philippines

References

1949 births
20th-century Filipino lawyers
Living people
Members of the House of Representatives of the Philippines from Cagayan
Mayors of places in Cagayan
Liberal Party (Philippines) politicians
United Nationalist Alliance politicians